Brian Bath (16 January 1947 – 16 October 2014) was a South African cricketer. He played 54 first-class matches for Transvaal between 1966 and 1974.

References

External links
 

1947 births
2014 deaths
South African cricketers
Gauteng cricketers
Cricketers from Johannesburg